= Medal "100th anniversary of the Azerbaijani police" =

Award of the Azerbaijani Armed Forces

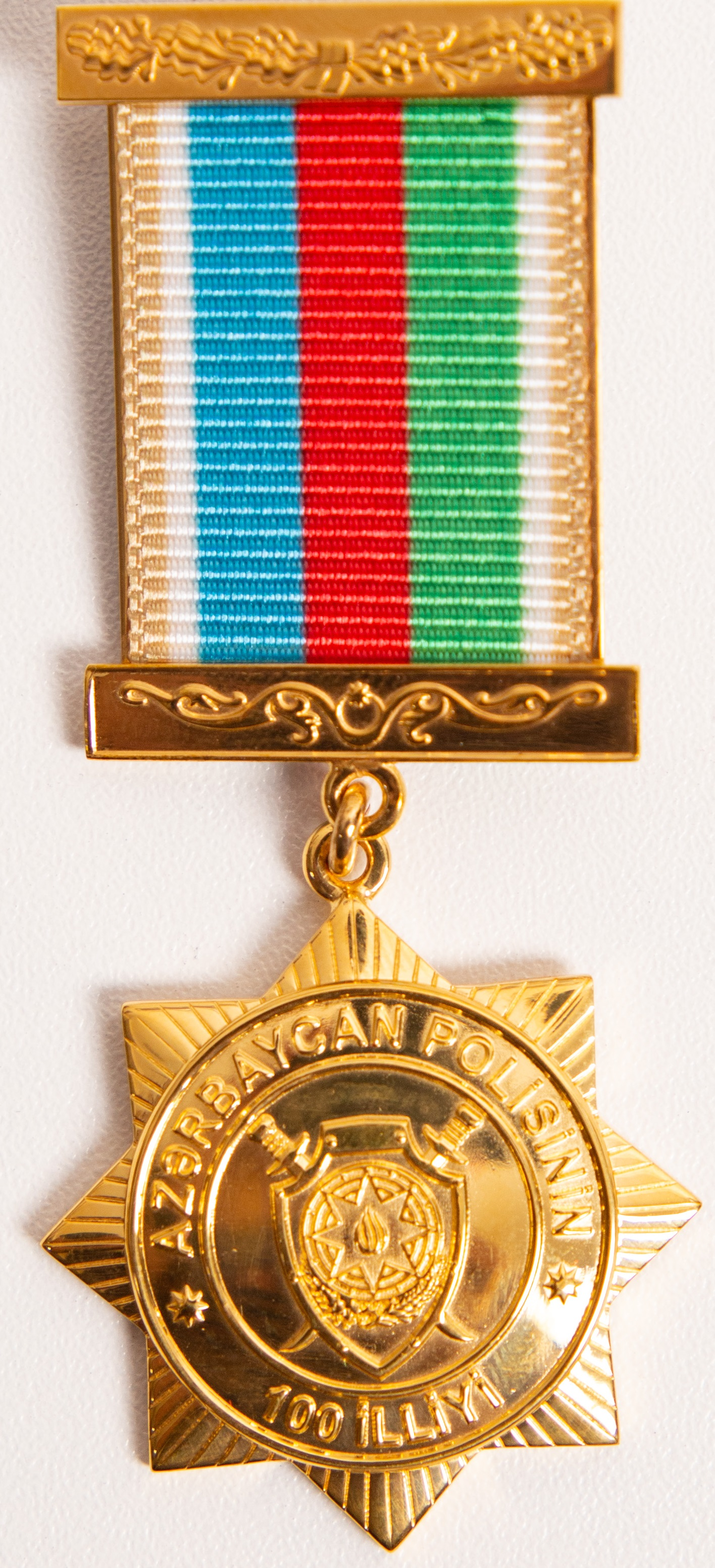
- Medal "100th anniversary of the Azerbaijani police"
- Type: medal
- Country: Azerbaijan
- Presented by: the state
- Eligibility: active military service before October 02, 2017
- Ribbon of the medal

Medal "100th anniversary of the Azerbaijani police" (Azerbaijani: "Azərbaycan Polisinin 100 illiyi (1918-2018)" yubiley medalı) is a state award of Azerbaijan. The award was established on October 2, 2017, in accordance with the law numbered 790-VQD.

== Description of the medal ==
The jubilee medals "The 100th anniversary of the Azerbaijani police 1918-1920" were granted to employees who performed exemplary duties in the internal affairs bodies, achieved high results in the service, veterans, persons taking an active part in combating crime, ensuring public safety, and having special merits in the development of police bodies.

== The way of wearing ==
The medal "100th anniversary of the Azerbaijani police (1918-2018)" is worn on the left side of the chest and, if there are other orders and medals of the Republic of Azerbaijan, it is placed after the medal "95th anniversary of the Armed Forces of the Republic of Azerbaijan (1918-2013)".
